NGC 113 is an unbarred lenticular galaxy located in the constellation Cetus. It was discovered by German astronomer, Ernst Wilhelm Leberecht Tempel, on August 27, 1876.

References

External links
 
 

0113
Unbarred lenticular galaxies
Cetus (constellation)
001656
Astronomical objects discovered in 1876